Wu Yong is a fictional character in Water Margin, one of the Four Great Classical Novels in Chinese literature. Nicknamed "Knowledgeable Star", he ranks third among the 36 Heavenly Spirits, the first third of the 108 Stars of Destiny.

Background
The novel portrays Wu Yong as having a fair and handsome face and a long beard – typical features of learned and sophisticated men in Chinese literature. When Wu Yong is an ordinary teacher in a village school in Yuncheng County, he is already likened by some to Zhuge Liang and Chen Ping, two famous strategists of the Han dynasty, for his astuteness and wit. He is hence nicknamed "Knowledgeable Star".

Robbing the convoy of birthday gifts
Wu Yong first appears in the book when he watches Lei Heng, a chief constable of Yuncheng, fight the vagabond Liu Tang from his village school. Liu has come from afar to ask Chao Gai, the headman of Dongxi Village, to partner him to hijack valuables in transportation to the Grand Tutor Cai Jing in the imperial capital Dongjing. But he was tied up by Lei's patrol group while sleeping drunk in a temple because he looked suspicious. Chao Gai tricked Lei to release Liu when the group came to take a rest at his manor. But Liu is embittered and caught up with Lei to demand the money that Chao has given him as compensation for causing him much trouble. Wu Yong, who is a friend of Chao, steps forth to intervene when he senses Lei is about to lose. Chao comes to the scene and puts an end to the fray.

Taking Wu to his house, Chao Gai discloses Liu's proposal. Wu suggests roping in the three Ruan brothers as the current  team is too small. He goes to the fishing village where the fisherman brothers live, pretending that he has come to buy fish from them. Step by step he coaxes them to reveal whether they are unhappy with their poverty and want a change. When he is sure that the brothers are disgruntled and detest oppression by officials, Wu reveals his real purpose in calling. The Ruans welcome the invitation. The team at last comprises seven people, with Gongsun Sheng, a Taoist priest, joining in. 

Wu devises the hijack plan, which involves Bai Sheng, a loafer who has once received help from Chao Gai. Bai poses as a wine seller while the seven disguise themselves as date merchants, with Yellow Mud Ridge identified as where they would strike. Bai crosses the ridge carrying two buckets of wine when Chao's group and the gift-escorting party led by Yang Zhi are resting there in the shades of trees away from the blazing sun. Yang forbids his men, who are extremely thirsty, to buy any wine from Bai out of caution. Then Chao's group buy a bucket from him. Liu Tang pretends to want a free scoop from the second bucket. As soon as he has had a sip, Bai snatches the ladle from him and pours the remaining wine, now laced with drug, back into the bucket. As both buckets seem safe, with Liu looking all right, the soldiers badger Yang Zhi to allow them to have the remaining bucket. Yang relents and even he himself takes a sip. Once they become numb in their limbs and fall over, the seven men cart away the valuables.

Becoming an outlaw

Mad over the loss of the valuables, which are his birthday gift to his father-in-law Cai Jing, Grand Secretary Liang Shijie of [|Daming Prefecture]] orders Jizhou to quickly track down the robbers. Jizhou's authorities soon find clues and send constables to arrest the group in Chao Gai's house. However, with help of the magistrate's clerk Song Jiang and the two chief constables Zhu Tong and Lei Heng, Chao Gai gets away with Wu Yong, Gongsun Sheng and Liu Tang. They take refuge in the house of the Ruan brothers. There Wu Yong sets a plan that lures the constables who come for them into the marsh. Unfamiliar with the place, the pursuers are mown down by the robbers. The group then seek refuge in Liangshan Marsh.

Wang Lun, the leader of Liangshan, is unwilling to accept the group, fearing they would usurp his position. Sensing that Lin Chong, who has joined Liangshan earlier but has been cold-shouldered, resents Wang, Wu Yong instigates him to kill the leader. Chao Gai is then elected the new chief of Liangshan, with Wu Yong taking second position. Then, Wu deploys the men of Liangshan in a battle that wipes out the soldiers sent from Jizhou to eliminate them.

All his time at Liangshan Wu Yong is the band's chief strategist. He uses his wiles to force several heroes prized by Liangshan, such as Lu Junyi, Xu Ning and Zhu Tong, to join the stronghold. His astuteness helps Liangshan clinch victory in many military conflicts.

Death
Wu Yong and Gongsun Sheng are appointed as Liangshan's top strategists after the 108 Stars of Destiny came together in what is called the Grand Assembly, but Wu apparently enjoys higher standing.

Wu Yong assists Song to become Liangshan's chief after Chao Gai died, although Chao's last word is that his successor is whoever captures the person who killed him. Lu Junyi seizes Shi Wengong, the killer of Chao, but he faces widespread opposition apparently engineered by Wu. In the end Lu takes second position after Song.

Wu Yong is sceptical about Song Jiang's quest for imperial amnesty, but he casts his lot with him nevertheless. Without his support, Song could not have sold the idea to the rest. Following amnesty from Emperor Huizong, the Liangshan outlaws are sent to beat back invaders of the Liao Empire and put down rebel forces in Song territory. Wu Yong's resourcefulness helps Liangshan win many battles.

Wu Yong is one of the few Liangshan heroes who survive the campaigns. He is awarded an appointment at a prefecture for his contributions. One night, Song Jiang and Li Kui appear in his dream, telling him that they have been poisoned by corrupt officials in the imperial court. Wu Yong travels to Song's grave in Chuzhou (楚州; present-day Huai'an, Jiangsu), where he meets Hua Rong, who has had a similar dream. Overcome with grief, they hang themselves from a tree near the grave.

References
 
 
 
 
 
 
 

36 Heavenly Spirits
Fictional professors
Fictional characters from Shandong